Pak Wai Tsuen is a village in Kam Tin, Yuen Long District, Hong Kong.

Administration
Pak Wai Tsuen is one of the villages represented within the Kam Tin Rural Committee. For electoral purposes, Pak Wai Tsuen is part of the Kam Tin constituency, which is currently represented by Chris Li Chung-chi.

See also
 Shui Mei Tsuen and Shui Tau Tsuen, two adjacent villages

References

External links

 Delineation of area of existing village Shui Tau Tsuen (Kam Tin) for election of resident representative (2019 to 2022) (includes Pak Wai Tsuen)

Villages in Yuen Long District, Hong Kong
Kam Tin